Mieczysław Połukard (1930 in Warsaw, Poland – 26 October 1985 in Bydgoszcz, Poland) was a Polish motorcycle speedway rider and coach, the first Polish rider to ride in the Individual World Championship Final in 1959 and won the World Team Cup in 1961.

Career
He began his racing career with Sparta Wrocław. In 1955 he moved to Polonia Bydgoszcz.

He was the first Polish rider to ride in the Individual World Championship Final (1959) where he finished 12th with 5 points. He also represented Poland in the World Team Cup three times, in 1960 (4th place), 1961 (gold medal) and 1962 (bronze medal).

He was Individual Polish Champion once in 1954. He also rode in Golden Helmet Finals, but he never finished high enough to win a medal.

Accident
In 1968 he decided to retire. In his last match, he was involved in an accident on track, which resulted hospital treatment which required amputating his leg.

Death
He became a coach for Polonia Bydgoszcz. During track training sessions on the track he stood on the centre green coaching the riders. However, on 25 October 1985, a rider from Gorzów Wielkopolski lost control of his motorcycle and ran into Połukard, killing him.

Memorial
Since 1986 Criterium of Polish Speedway Leagues Aces, speedway meeting in Bydgoszcz who official opening of the new season, have a Mieczysław Połukard name (Polish: Kryterium Asów Polskich Lig Żużlowych im. Mieczysława Połukarda).

Honours 
Individual World Championship
1956 - 14th in Continental Final
1957 - 12th in Continental Semi-Final
1958 - 11th in Continental Quarter-Final
1959 - 12th place - 5 points (0,2,0,1,2) - First Polish rider in World Final
1960 - track reserve in World Final
1961 - 15th in European Final
1962 - 12th in Continental Semi-Final
1963 - 10th in Continental Semi-Final
1964 - 10th in Continental Quarter-Final
World Team Cup
1960 - 4th place - 2 points (0,1,0,1)
1961 - World Champion - 5 points (2,1,2,-)
1962 - Bronze medal - 0 point (0)

World Final Appearances

Individual World Championship
 1959 -  London, Wembley Stadium - 12th - 5pts
 1960 -  London, Wembley Stadium - Reserve, did not ride

World Team Cup
 1960 -  Göteborg, Ullevi (with Konstanty Pociejkowicz / Marian Kaiser / Jan Malinowski) - 4th - 7pts (2)
 1961 -  Wrocław, Olympic Stadium (with Marian Kaiser / Henryk Żyto / Florian Kapała / Stanisław Tkocz) - Winner - 32pts (5)
 1962 -  Slaný (with Marian Kaiser / Florian Kapała / Joachim Maj / Paweł Waloszek) - 3rd - 20pts (0)

Individual Ice Speedway World Championship
 1966 -  Ufa/Moscow - 14th - 9pts

See also 
Speedway in Poland

References

1930 births
1985 deaths
Polish speedway riders
Polish sports coaches
Polish speedway champions
Polonia Bydgoszcz riders